Andrea Gardiner (born January 10, 1981) is an American former competitive figure skater. She is the 2000 Nebelhorn Trophy bronze medalist and competed twice at the Four Continents Championships, placing 8th in 2000 and 11th in 2002. She was coached by Becky Dever at the 2000 U.S. Championships with Kitty Carruthers and Nathan Birch as choreographer.

Programs

Results

References

External links
 

1981 births
Living people
African-American sportswomen
American female single skaters
Sportspeople from Houston
21st-century African-American sportspeople
21st-century African-American women
20th-century African-American people
20th-century African-American women